Collinsium was a genus of lobopodian from the Early Cambrian. It is represented by a single fossil species, Collinsium ciliosum, found in the Xiaoshiba Lagerstätte (Hongjingshao Formation) of China. Similar to the later Hallucigenia it was a small worm-like creature with spikes along its back and feeding tentacles near its head. Unlike Hallucigenia, Collinsium had 9 walking appendages and 4 fine anterior appendages. Its body was covered in hair-like Papillae, and its fine anterior appendages were lined with Setae likely used for filter feeding. The generic name honors paleontologist Desmond Collins.

References 

Prehistoric protostome genera
Cambrian China
Fossils of China
Fossil taxa described in 2015